Tonee Hayes (born January 11, 1995), better known by his stage name Nef the Pharaoh, is an American rapper from Vallejo, California. In 2014 he was selected by fans as the "Bay Area Freshman of the Year" in a yearly contest held by Thizzler.com. In early 2015, his track "Big Tymin'" became a regional hit, with a music video released shortly after Nef the Pharaoh signed with Sick Wid It Records. "Big Tymin'" was remixed by YG and Ty Dolla $ign in July 2015, and his self-titled debut EP was released on Sick Wid It on November 6, 2015. He released his full-length debut album titled The Chang Project on April 27, 2017.

Early life
Tonee Hayes was born on January 11, 1995, in Oakland, California. He was featured on the cover of the Vallejo Times-Herald at the age of 17. Hayes has cited Vallejo rappers like Mac Dre and E-40 as significant influences on his style. He was given the nickname Nef (short for nephew) from his uncle, which he incorporated into part of his stage name. He went to Inderkum High School and later transferred to Discovery High School.

Music career

Early releases
Starting his music career as an "internet freestyler," in 2014 Nef the Pharaoh had what Vice Media referred to as a "local hit" with the single "Bitch I'm From Vallejo." In 2014, E-40 contacted Giggles about Bay Cookies, and Nef the Pharaoh was subsequently featured on E-40's Sharp On All 4 Corners album. In 2014 he was selected by fans as the "Bay Area Freshman of the Year" held by Thizzler.com. Early on he performed at the last held "Bay Area Freshman" concert. His single "I'm From Vallejo" was remixed with features from E-40 and Willie Joe of Vallejo. As of copyright, Nef the Pharaoh was working on his new album.

"Big Tymin'" single (2015)

In July 2015 Nef the Pharaoh released his track "Big Tymin'" which featured lyrics paying tribute to Big Tymers members Birdman and Mannie Fresh. The song is "an homage to New Orleans bounce music."

Pitchfork called "Big Tymin'" a "major hit," writing "its lyrics are loosely structured and almost free-associative." Complex Magazine wrote in May 2015 that "Big Tymin'" is "a Bay-style tribute to classic Cash Money... compared with Bankroll Fresh, whose 'Hot Boy' flipped a similar trick, 'Big Tymin" is bright, upbeat fun—much closer in spirit to its inspiration than the ATLien's dour repetition." The Vice Media site Noisey wrote about the track that "with 'Big Tymin',' he has another clap on his hands. Paying homage to Cash Money’s Big Tymers, Nef goes in on a minimal beat...."

Remixes and performances (2015-present)

The music websites Noisey and Thizzler on the Roof included "Big Tymin'" on their On the Roof Vol. 2: Mob Forever, dedicated to The Jacka in May 2015. After "Big Tymin" had become known regionally, Nef the Pharaoh signed with E-40's Sick Wid It label in early 2015, and they re-released the track. "Big Tymin'" was remixed by YG and Ty Dolla $ign in July 2015, with the remix premiering on sites such as Hotnewhiphop.com on July 25 and RapUp.com.

In October 2015, Nef the Pharaoh freestyled live on the radio station Power 106, and he has also performed live on KMEL-FM. His self-titled debut EP was released on Sick Wid It on November 6, 2015.Complex was one of the websites to stream the EP live and give it a positive review, with HipHopDX also streaming it. He performed a release show in downtown Oakland for the EP. As of 2015, he was working on a collection of pre-rolled joints to sell at Bay Area cannabis clubs, with plans to launch an apparel line and his own music label KILFMB. He released his debut album, The Chang Project.

In August 2018, Nef the Pharaoh released Blow up Bed, a song which featured Los Angeles rapper 03 Greedo. The song was chosen as "Best new Music" by Pitchfork.com.

Personal life
Hayes' son was born in 2014.  He has an older sister and two younger brothers.

Discography

Studio albums 
 The Chang Project (2017)
 The Big Chang Theory (2018)
 Mushrooms & Coloring Books (2019)
 HearYEE HearYEE (2020)
 SINsational (2021)
 The Tonight Show With Nef The Pharaoh (2021) with DJ.Fresh

Compilation Albums
 Sick Wid It: The Year of the Pig (2021) with Sick Wid It

Extended plays 

 Nef the Pharaoh (2015)
 Porter 2 Grape (2018) with 03 Greedo
 Vice Versa (2018) with ShooterGang Kony
 CHANGSZN (2020)
 CHANGSZN 2 (2020)

Mixtapes 
 Rich by 25 Two (2014)
 Neffy Got Wings (2015) with Cardo (record producer)
 The Lost Tapes (2016)
 Fresh Outta Space 3 (2016)

Singles

as Featured artist 
War With Me - Kt Foreign ft. Yhung TO, Nef The Pharaoh

Bully Tha Bullie$ - Lynne Tracy, Kent Kern

Guest appearances

See also
List of artists on Sick Wid It Records
List of northern California rappers

References

External links
Nef the Pharaoh on Bandcamp  
Nef the Pharaoh on VEVO

Living people
1995 births
Musicians from Vallejo, California
Rappers from the San Francisco Bay Area